Roxana Preussler (born November 30, 1979) is a female marathon runner from Argentina, who won the 2005 edition of the Buenos Aires Marathon in her native country. She twice won the Mar del Plata Marathon (1999 and 2000).

Achievements

References
 ARRS

1979 births
Living people
Argentine female marathon runners
Argentine female long-distance runners
Argentine people of German descent
Place of birth missing (living people)
21st-century Argentine women